Bays is an unincorporated community in Wood County, in the U.S. state of Ohio.

History
Bays was platted in 1890. A post office was established at Bays in 1890, and remained in operation until 1915.

References

Unincorporated communities in Wood County, Ohio
Unincorporated communities in Ohio